Sutonocrea is a genus of moths in the family Erebidae.

Species
 Sutonocrea duplicata Gaede, 1928
 Sutonocrea fassli Dognin, 1910
 Sutonocrea hoffmanni Schaus, 1933
 Sutonocrea lobifer Herrich-Schäffer, 1855
 Sutonocrea reducta Walker, 1856

Former species
 Sutonocrea novata Dognin, 1924

References

Natural History Museum Lepidoptera generic names catalog

Phaegopterina
Moth genera